P111 may refer to:

Vessels 
 , a patrol boat of the Colombian Navy
 , a patrol boat of the Mexican Navy
 , a patrol boat of the Turkish Navy

Other uses 
 Boulton Paul P.111, a British experimental aircraft
 Papyrus 111, a biblical manuscript
 Pentium III, a central processing unit
 Piaggio P.111, an Italian high-altitude research aircraft
 P111, a state regional road in Latvia